Bose Nukse Creek is a stream in the U.S. state of Mississippi. It is a tributary to the Pearl River.

Bose Nukse Creek is a name derived from the Choctaw language, but the meaning of its native name has been lost.

References

Rivers of Mississippi
Rivers of Leake County, Mississippi
Mississippi placenames of Native American origin